is a Japanese actor, voice actor and radio personality. He was formerly affiliated with Big Apple, Radix Mobanimation Multicye Division and Varoque Works, and is currently affiliated with Aoni Production. He was born in Fukushima Prefecture and is now living in Tokyo. He is best known for playing MegaBlue/Shun Namiki in Denji Sentai Megaranger.

Overview
He made his debut role as Mega Blue / Shun Namiki in the 1997- 1998 Super Sentai series , Denji Sentai Megaranger, a role he later reprised in the teamup special Gingaman vs. Megaranger.

Filmography

TV animation
1999
Sensual Phrase (Sakuya Ookochi)

2001
Pokémon (Matsuba)
Zoids: New Century Zero (Ballad Hunter)

2002
Heat Guy J (Daisuke Aurora)

2003
Dear Boys (Takumi Fujiwara)

2005
Jigoku Shōjo (Ren Ichimoku)
The Law of Ueki (Niko)

2006
Ouran High School Host Club (Kyoya Ootori)
Witchblade (Yuusuke Tozawa)

2007
Death Note (Teru Mikami)
Nodame Cantabile (Yasunori Kuroki)
Ookiku Furikabutte (Motoki Haruna)
Shion no Ō (Satoru Hani)

2008
Blassreiter (Joseph Jobson)
Darker than Black: Gemini of the Meteor (August 7)
Gin Tama (Kyoujirou Nakamura)
Nijū Mensō no Musume (Ken)
One Outs (Takami Itsuki)
Yu-Gi-Oh! 5D's (Divine)

2009
Birdy the Mighty Decode 02 (Nataru Shinmyou)

2010
Durarara!! (Morita)
Fairy Tail (Ren Akatsuki)
Reborn! (Kawahira)
Seikon no Qwaser (Joshua Phrygianos)

2011
Hunter × Hunter (TV 2011) (Gittarackur/Illumi Zoldyck)
Kami-sama no Memo-chō (Tetsuo Ichinomiya "Tetsu")

2012
Jormungand (Kasper Hekmatyar)
Mōretsu Pirates (Kane McDougal)

2013
Danganronpa: The Animation (Yasuhiro Hagakure)
Beyond the Boundary (Miroku Fujima)

2014
Pretty Guardian Sailor Moon Crystal (Zoisite)
Shirobako (Shun Watanabe)

2015
Durarara!! x2 Shou (Morita)
Mobile Suit Gundam: Iron-Blooded Orphans (Gaelio Bauduin/Vidar)
Samurai Warriors　(Tōdō Takatora)

2016
Cardfight!! Vanguard G NEXT (Kazumi Onimaru)
The Disastrous Life of Saiki K. (Metori Saiko)
Danganronpa 3: The End of Hope's Peak High School (Yasuhiro Hagakure)

2017
ID-0 (Rick Ayer)
Sword Oratoria (Dionysus)

2018
Hakata Tonkotsu Ramens (Naoya Nitta)
Hakumei and Mikochi (Iwashi (ep. 3, 5 - 6))
A Certain Magical Index III (Teitoku Kakine)

2019
One-Punch Man 2 (Suiryū)
Stars Align (Ryōma Shinjō)

2020
The Case Files of Jeweler Richard (Jeffrey Claremont)
A Certain Scientific Railgun T (Teitoku Kakine)
Darwin's Game (Game Master)
King's Raid: Successors of the Will (Kyle)
Attack on Titan: The Final Season (Colt Grice)

2021
Shinkansen Henkei Robo Shinkalion Z (Valtom)
Tokyo Revengers (Shinichiro Sano)
Moriarty the Patriot (Baxter)

2022
Shenmue (Ryo Hazuki)
Love All Play (Shizuo Nakano)
Shinobi no Ittoki (Genji Kajarishi)

Unknown date
Get Ride! Amdriver (Ragna Lawrelia)
RockMan.EXE (Blues)
RockMan.EXE AXESS (Blues/Dark Blues)
RockMan.EXE Stream (Blues)
RockMan.EXE Beast (Blues)
RockMan.EXE Beast+ (Blues)
Ginyū Mokushiroku Meine Liebe wieder (Nicholas)
Shōnen Onmyōji (Taijō)
Tactics (Raiko Minamoto)

Original video animation (OVA)
Code Geass: Akito the Exiled (????) (Shin Hyuga Shaingu)
Vie Durant (????) (Jei)

Theatrical animation
RockMan.EXE: The Program of Light and Darkness (2005) (Blues)
Shirobako: The Movie (2020) (Shun Watanabe)
Gridman Universe (2023) (Vit)

Video games
Shenmue (1999) (Ryo Hazuki)
Shenmue II (2001) (Ryo Hazuki)
Get Ride! Amdriver (2004) (Ragna Lawrelia)
Grandia III (2005) (Yuuki)
12Riven (2008) (Mei Kiridara)
Tales of Hearts (2008) (Hisui Hearts)
Danganronpa: Trigger Happy Havoc (2010) (Yasuhiro Hagakure)
Desert Kingdom (2010) (Sharon)
Z.H.P. Unlosing Ranger VS Darkdeath Evilman (2010) (Pirohiko Ichimonji)
Renai Banchou 2 MidnightLesson!!! (2012) (Choi-Ero Banchou)
Samurai Warriors: Chronicles 2nd (2012) (Takatora Tōdō)
Desert Kingdom Portable (2013) (Sharon)
Super Robot Wars UX (2013) (Jin Spencer)
Samurai Warriors 4 (2014) (Takatora Tōdō)
Until Dawn (2014) (Mike (Brett Dalton)) (Japanese dub)
Project X Zone 2 (2015) (Ryo Hazuki)
Super Bomberman R (2017) (Yellow Bomberman)
Danganronpa V3: Killing Harmony (2017) (Yasuhiro Hagakure)
Zanki Zero (2018) (Mamoru Ichiyo (Child))
Shenmue III (2019) (Ryo Hazuki)
Sensual Phrase CLIMAX -Next Generation- (2019) (Sakuya Ookuchi)
Ouran High School Host Club (????) (Kyoya Ootori)
Granblue Fantasy (2019) (Cassius)
Fate/Grand Order (2021) (Percival)
Soul Hackers 2 (2022) (Saizo)
One Piece Odyssey (2023) (Adio Suerte)

Radio
Maji Asa! (????) (DJ, with Yuko Nakazawa)

Dubbing
Power Rangers in Space (1998): Zhane/Silver Ranger (Justin Nimmo) (Japanese dub)
Fantastic Four (2008): Johnny Storm/Human Torch (Chris Evans) (NTV edition)

TV
Oha Star (????) (Oha Star Bancho)
Cinnamon (????) (Main MC)

TV Drama
Denji Sentai Megaranger (1997-1998): Namiki  Shun /Mega Blue 
Denji Sentai Megaranger vs  Carranger ( 1997): Namiki Shun / Mega Blue 
Seijuu Sentai Gingaman vs megaranger  (1998): Namiki Shun / Mega Blue
Godzilla vs. Megaguirus (2000)
Hyakujuu Sentai Gaoranger  vs. super sentai (2001): Namiki Shun / Mega Blue 
Ninpuu Sentai Hurricaneger (2002-2003): Katsuya Misaki (ep. 26)
Jigoku Shōjo (2006) (Episode 7: Tatsumi Sakaichi)
Engine Sentai Go-onger: Boom Boom! Bang Bang! GekijōBang!! (2008): Gokumaru
Engine Sentai Go-onger (2008-2009): Gokugokumaru (eps. 39 - 40)
Samurai Sentai Shinkenger (2009-2010): Masataka Shiba / Shinken Red  (eps. 11, 45)
Zyuden Sentai Kyoryuger (2013-2014): Resentful Knight Endolf (eps. 25 ,26, 27,28, 29, 42,43,44,45, 46, 47)

Musical
Princess Knight (????) (Princess Franz)

References

External links
 

1976 births
Living people
Actors from Fukushima Prefecture
Aoni Production voice actors
Japanese male film actors
Japanese male musical theatre actors
Japanese male television actors
Japanese male video game actors
Japanese male voice actors
Male voice actors from Fukushima Prefecture
20th-century Japanese male actors
21st-century Japanese male actors